Șopot may refer to following rivers in Romania:

 , a tributary of the Bega in Timiș County
 , a tributary of the Olt in the city of Slatina, Olt County
 , a tributary of the Valea Mare in Timiș County

See also 

 Șopotu, a tributary of the Nera in Caraș-Severin County, Romania
 Sopot (river), a tributary of the Tanew, Poland
 Sopot (disambiguation)
 Šopot, a village in the city of Benkovac, Croatia